Mo' Roots may refer to:

 Mo' Roots (Taj Mahal album), 1974
 Mo' Roots (Maceo Parker album), 1991